The Lakeside Inn is a historic site in Mount Dora, Florida. It is located at 100 North Alexander Street. On March 19, 1987, it was added to the U.S. National Register of Historic Places. It was for sale in 2010, and purchased by new owners, who planned to renovate it, later that year. Built in 1883, Lakeside Inn is the oldest continuously operating hotel in the State of Florida. The last of the Grand Victorian Era Hotels still remaining in Central Florida it is said to be the most historic hotel there. Throughout its 130-year history, Lakeside Inn has hosted many noted dignitaries and celebrities, including President Calvin Coolidge and First Lady Grace Coolidge, for a month-long stay in the winter of 1930. Lakeside Inn has also been distinguished as the number one venue in the Central Florida Lakes Region for wedding ceremonies and receptions

References

External links
 
 Lake County listings at National Register of Historic Places
 Florida's Office of Cultural and Historical Programs
 Lake County listings
 Lakeside Inn

National Register of Historic Places in Lake County, Florida
Hotels in Florida
Mount Dora, Florida
Hotel buildings on the National Register of Historic Places in Florida